The 2002 Tour de Pologne was the 59th edition of the Tour de Pologne cycle race and was held from 9 September to 15 September 2002. The race started in Gdańsk and finished in Karpacz on a route identical to that of the previous edition. The race was won by former world champion Laurent Brochard.

General classification

References

2002
Tour de Pologne
September 2002 sports events in Europe